Castell de la Fosca or Punta del Castell is an ancient Iberian settlement or oppidum sited on a rocky promontory at the north end of the beach called Platja de Castell, about  ENE of Palamós (Baix Empordà), on the Costa Brava.

The settlement, which seems to have been inhabited from the 6th century BC to the 1st century AD, was protected by a wall and two square towers. Archaeologists, first in the 1930s and 1940s, and now in a series of excavations begun in 2001, have discovered 64 storage pits and two water cisterns, as well as pottery, amphorae (both locally made and imported), millstones, weights for fishing nets, lamps, agricultural tools and surgical instruments, coins, pieces of bronze, Iberian inscriptions, and the bases of two columns.

Gallery

See also
Indigetes

References

External links

  (Panoramic view of the Iberian village)

Pre-Roman peoples of the Iberian Peninsula
Archaeological sites in Catalonia
6th-century BC establishments
Buildings and structures completed in the 6th century BC
Former populated places in Spain
Baix Empordà
1st-century disestablishments
Ruins in Spain
Iberians